He Do the Time Police in Different Voices is a collection of parodies and pastiches of the work of multiple authors of science fiction, fantasy, and detective fiction, all written by David Langford between 1976 and 2002 for various publications; the collection was published in 2003 by Wildside Press. The title is an homage to the originally proposed title of T. S. Eliot's groundbreaking poem, The Waste Land (itself named after a passage from Charles Dickens's Our Mutual Friend).

Reception
Emerald City described HDTTPIDVs content as "devastating Langfordian parodies", while Analog Science Fiction and Fact called it "delightful" and "good clean fun," and Michael Bishop, writing in the New York Review of Science Fiction, stated that it was "hilarious", and "enthusiastically recommend(ed)" it.

List of authors parodied in HDTTPIDV

 Piers Anthony
 Isaac Asimov
 Jorge Luis Borges
 Lewis Carroll
 G. K. Chesterton
 Agatha Christie
 Arthur Conan Doyle
 Harlan Ellison
 The Brothers Grimm
 Frank Herbert
 William Hope Hodgson
 H. P. Lovecraft
 Michael Moorcock
 Damon Runyon
 E. E. Smith
 Rex Stout
 A. E. van Vogt
 James White

References

2003 books
Science fiction anthologies
Fantasy parodies
Fantasy anthologies
Wildside Press books